Visa requirements for Swazi citizens are administrative entry restrictions by the authorities of other states placed on citizens of Eswatini. As of 2 July 2019, Swazi citizens had visa-free or visa on arrival access to 72 countries and territories, ranking the Swazi passport 72nd in terms of travel freedom according to the Henley Passport Index.

Visa requirements map

Visa requirements

Dependent, Disputed, or Restricted territories
Unrecognized or partially recognized countries

Dependent and autonomous territories

See also
Visa policy of Eswatini
Swazi passport

References and Notes
References

Notes

Eswatini
Foreign relations of Eswatini